Inodoro Pereyra (The Renegade) is an Argentinean comic created in 1972 by the writer and cartoonist Roberto Fontanarrosa. The main character is a cartoon of a lonely Argentinean gaucho living in the Argentinean Pampas. Full of social, psychological, political and philosophical humor, It parodies to comical effect the language and mannerisms of the gaucho, as for example in the name "Inodoro" a mock-typical gaucho name (taken from the Catholic santoral) like "Isidoro", "Casimiro" etc., but "Inodoro" meaning actually in Spanish "toilet seat".

Publication history
The comic appeared for first time at the end of 1972 in the popular humor magazine Hortensia, originating from the Córdoba Province (Argentina), which was the home of a pool of talented people at that time.

The comic was originally a parody about the linguistics and stereotypes of the native people. Specifically, the main characters were some gaucho characters from comic books (such as Santos Leiva, Lindor Covas "the wild", El Huinca or Fabián Leyes, etc). The comic at this time was more elaborate graphically. In all these early editions, Inodoro hosts a diverse and weird group of visitors in the Pampa region of Argentina, while his inseparable friend, Mendieta, the talking dog, shares the adventures of his owner. Mendieta frequently shares his opinions with Inodoro, giving birth to phrases like: "Let us negotiate, Mr. Inodoro" and "Who gave birth to it!" (similar meaning to "Wow!", or "Who would have thought so...").
 
Then the comic appeared in the Mengano and Siete Días magazines, with adventures in each episode. Mendieta once declared that he was in reality "a Christian man that was turned into a dog shape due to a moon eclipse". Mendieta occupied the co-protagonist role in these times.

The episodes of Inodoro Pereyra in this period mostly consisted of two or three pages. Each series was composed of around 10 episodes.

At the beginning of each episode the author gives a short recap of what happened in the previous episode. The recap was in a humoristic style, using radio theater language, gauchesca poetry and feuilleton language in an ironic way. Finally, in 1976, Inodoro settled down with his partner, Eulogia Tapia, and Mendieta in a famous newspaper from Buenos Aires called Clarín, where the comic was published in single editions. The previous coverage of adventures gave way to a greater focus on dialogue and subtle humor.

The drawing style suffered a major change after 1975. From 1972 until 1975 the characters were drawn with a slim shape with thick lines and striking contrasts. From 1976 Inodoro Pereyra appeared with a drawing style that gave him a soft expression (rather than the angry wrinkles of the past), while his partner "La Eulogia" is no longer a young stylized woman but a rotund and clumsy housewife.

After being placed in different areas of the newspaper, the comic was added to Viva, the Sunday magazine of Clarín. Here Inodoro was a more tranquil personality, settled in his humble house with his wife, dog, pigsty and a lonely tree. The Inodoro Pereyra comics were also published in book format by Ediciones de la Flor.

The main difference with other comics is that in Inodoro comics, the humoristic touch is not present exclusively at the end of the comic but usually in every frame (mainly since the comic started to be published as single editions).

Most of the middle jokes and the ending ones are delivered by Mendieta, acting as the voice of reason in this comic of absurd and erratic humor. Also the humoristic touch of this comic in mainly based in the language used by Inodoro Pereyra, who uses a lot of word games and rhymes.

Characters

Inodoro Pereyra
He is a parody of Pampa´s stereotypical Argentinean gaucho, based on Martín Fierro, a famous gaucho. He meditates in loneliness about life, accompanied by his dog Mendieta, and receives strangers in his home, to whom he gives peculiar advice. The humor of the comic is largely based around Inodoro’s language, with extensive use of wordplay and puns.

Mendieta
He is a small, friendly dog from an unknown race that has the ability to speak. He shares Inodoro´s adventures, participating in the reasoning and acting as Pereyra´s confident. In fact, Mendieta was the seventh male child of a family and was born on a full moon night; legend says that he should have been transformed into a werewolf, but he had bad luck and as that night there was a lunar eclipse, he instead became a dog with the power of speech.

Eulogia Tapia
In the first Inodoro Pereyra comic in 1972 she appears as the young bride of the gaucho. She was drawn as a very young and slim woman with beautiful facial features (even within the cartoonish aesthetics of the drawings). She later started being drawn as an ugly fat lady since 1976, even increasing her weight by 25 kg in a single frame. She is home-loving, has a bad temper and is jealous to the point of getting angry like a beast when Inodoro is late.

The parrots
Through the years, these are the quintessential enemies of Inodoro. They move around as a flock, teasing and making fun of him. While they generate various problems and harm, sometimes they help him, making the gaucho a bit confused. From among the flock of parrots, Lorenzo stands out.

The ranqueles
These are wild Indians (natives) that from time to time visit Inodoro´s house, either asking for advice or threatening him. Their leader is Chief Crybaby (In Argentinean Spanish: Lloriqueo)."If we were meditating we would not be an Indian tribe. We would be a stream of thought".

Nabucodonosor II
A talking vegetarian pig, he believes that he is a sex symbol, as he is the only male among several female pigs. He won 1st place in a local fair, and thinks that he is a philosopher and an intellectual.

The Scorpion Resolana
He is the bravest gaucho in the area. On one occasion he fought with Inodoro Pereyra because he offended Eulogia, Inodoro´s wife.

Famous Quotes 
Inodoro: Being alone is nothing, the bad thing is realizing that.

Mendieta: Who gave birth to it! [Similar meaning to  "Wow!", or "Who would have thought so..."].

Inodoro: God, give me patience… but right now!

Inodoro: I´m engaged to my land, married to its problems and divorced from its richness.

Mendieta: How are you winning your living?
Inodoro: Winning? In my case I think it is a draw.

Mister: Good Morning. Are you Inodoro Pereira?
Inodoro: Present [a parody of the religious phrase "with the deceased present"].

Mister: I heard that you are the last gaucho.
Inodoro: What!? I didn´t know that this was a race, my friend! Who was the first?

Inodoro: I wonder… Mendieta… in order to harvest milk… is there a need to plant a cow? Mendieta: And harvest soup? 
Inodoro: So many times I have thrown the soup in the field and not even a noodle grew!

Eulogy: There is a girl in town saying that you are the father of her twins... 
Inodoro: That's an exaggeration ... One of the children… perhaps, but not both...

Inodoro: I am not lazy; I may be a little timid to work.

Mendieta: Small creatures of God [talking sarcastically about the parrots].

Mendieta: Tell me Mr. Inodoro… Are you with Eulogia because of some promise you made?
Inodoro: Mendieta, one is dazzled by the beautiful woman, is amazed by the intelligent one… and finally ends up with the one who give us some attention.

Mister: Good afternoon Mr. Inodoro. How are you?
Inodoro: I am bad, but I am used to it.

Inodoro: Hail purest Mary, without sign conceived! (Instead of ‘without sin conceived’. The original in Argentinean Spanish is a rhyme generated by the change of the word ‘sin’ by ‘sign’ that in Argentinean Spanish end in the same letter "o").

Inodoro: As said Balcarce, it is so cold that you can die. (This is also an ironic phrase as in Argentinean Spanish it is usually said "it’s so cold that I shit on myself" and the name "Balcarce" and "cagarse" (shit on) have an ending rhyme).

Inodoro: You are not fat, Eulogia. You are a bulwark against unpatriotic anorexia.

Inodoro: I am already angry…

Inodoro: There comes the gaucho Juan Salse…

Inodoro: I am a meteorology critic, Mister. Last night’s storm report: "Was weak in the lightening illumination, rain was too repetitive, the scenery was poor, the sound of the thunder was bad; in other words, a fail in God´s staging. A typical summertime performance, light and careless for an undemanding public."

Mendieta: Just the face had to be. (This could be referring to someone with an ugly face).
Inodoro: One thing is the friendly sincerity and another thing is the unnecessary cruelty.

Inodoro: My house is nor big, nor clean.

Inodoro: So I said, after so many years, if I have to choose again, I would choose my Eulogia with my eyes closed…because if I open them I’ll choose another one.

Inodoro: So big is the drought that Paulina (the name of his cow) gave me powdered milk again.

Inodoro: Mendieta… The espadrille is a corrective shoe?
Mendieta: I don´t think so, Inodoro.
Inodoro: I am asking this because my Dad used to correct me by espadrille hits.

Inodoro: Make way!  Make way! [Literally in Argentinean Spanish: Open the field!] 
I am coming!

Inodoro: Let´s see… said a blind man.

External links
Inodoro Pereyra en Todohistorietas
Inodoro Pereyra en el sitio web de Fontanarrosa

Argentine comic strips
Fictional Argentine people
Fictional gauchos
Satirical comics
Humor comics
Cultural depictions of Argentine people
Comics set in Argentina
Argentine comics adapted into films
Comics characters introduced in 1972
Male characters in comics